State Route 133 (SR 133) is a state highway in the U.S. state of California, serving as an urban route in Orange County. It connects SR 1 in Laguna Beach through the San Joaquin Hills with several freeways in Irvine, ending at the SR 241, a toll road in the latter city. It is built as an expressway from SR 73 to Laguna Canyon Road (just south of I-405 in Irvine), and past this, SR 133 is a freeway (the Laguna Freeway) to I-5, and a tollway (part of the Eastern Transportation Corridor) to SR 241 near the Santa Ana Mountains.

SR 133 was constructed as a county road by the 1910s; the portion from I-405 to I-5 was upgraded to a freeway four decades later. The state canceled plans to extend the freeway segment south, and the southern part of the road remains an undivided highway. In 1998, most of the Eastern Transportation Corridor opened, and the connector between I-5 and SR 241 was designated as a toll extension of SR 133.

Route description

SR 133 begins at SR 1, the Pacific Coast Highway, as Broadway in Laguna Beach, a block from the Pacific Ocean. The name changes to Laguna Canyon Road as the highway leaves downtown Laguna Beach and enters Laguna Canyon, soon narrowing to one lane in each direction. After entering the canyon, which lies between Laguna Coast Wilderness Park (west side of SR 133) and Aliso and Wood Canyons Wilderness Park (east side of SR 133), the first major intersection is with El Toro Road (CR S18). SR 133 widens to four lanes and becomes a highway after its interchange with SR 73, the San Joaquin Hills Toll Road.

As it continues through the Laguna Coast Wilderness Park, SR 133 follows a four-lane alignment on the west side of the canyon, moved from the old two-lane road in the center of the canyon in late 2006. Laguna Canyon Road splits to the northwest where the canyon ends in Irvine. North of the park, the highway becomes the Laguna Freeway after crossing an at-grade intersection with Laguna Canyon Road, followed by an interchange at exit 8, I-405, the San Diego Freeway. SR 133 then continues as a freeway and serves Barranca Parkway and the I-5, the Santa Ana Freeway. After crossing I-5, SR 133 becomes part of the Eastern Transportation Corridor along the northwest side of Marine Corps Air Station El Toro, crossing an interchange with Irvine Boulevard at exit 12 before ending at SR 241.

SR 133 is part of the California Freeway and Expressway System north of SR 73, and is part of the National Highway System, a network of highways that are considered essential to the country's economy, defense, and mobility by the Federal Highway Administration.

History
As part of its construction of concrete roads, started by a 1913 bond issue, Orange County paved the county road through Laguna Canyon, connecting State Highway Route 2 (the forerunner of US 101 and I-5) at Irvine with Laguna Beach, by 1917. The road was added to the state highway system in 1933 as Route 185, an unsigned designation. The entire route was added to the new California Freeway and Expressway System in 1959; the planned upgrade had already been named the Laguna Freeway by the California Highway Commission on November 26, 1957. The highway received a sign route number—State Route 133—in the 1964 renumbering.

The opening of the first—and only—piece of the Laguna Freeway was celebrated in Laguna Beach on October 1, 1952, connecting the north end of Laguna Canyon with a planned extension of the Santa Ana Freeway at a trumpet interchange and bypassing the old route on Sand Canyon Avenue. There were initially no other interchanges along the route. The state decided not to build the remainder of the freeway in late 1975, and in 1996 the portion south of SR 73 was removed from the Freeway and Expressway System. Widening of the part north of SR 73 to a four-lane expressway was completed in late 2006, moving the road out of the canyon bottom and allowing better access to areas in Laguna Coast Wilderness Park.

A new SR 231 was added to the state highway system in 1988, connecting I-5 northwest of Irvine with SR 91, and in 1991 the south end was shifted southeast to the north end of SR 133, with the old route becoming SR 261. To prevent the route from changing numbers as it crossed I-5, the southern portion was renumbered SR 133 in 1996, with the remainder becoming an extended SR 241. The Eastern Transportation Corridor, which includes SR 133 north of I-5, was completed on October 15, 1998, opening a new shortcut from Orange County to the northeast.

Tolls

The tolled portion of SR 133 (from I-5 in the south to SR 241 in the north) employs a barrier toll system, where drivers are charged flat-rate tolls based on what particular toll booths they pass through. Since May 13, 2014, the road has been using an all-electronic, open road tolling system. And on October 2, 2019, the license plate tolling program, under the brand name "ExpressAccount", was discontinued. Drivers may still pay using the FasTrak electronic toll collection system or via a one time payment online. Drivers must pay within 5 days after their trip on the toll road or they will be assessed a toll violation.

Tolls are collected at the northbound exit and southbound entrance of Irvine Boulevard and at the Orange Grove Toll Plaza, which spans the on-and off-ramps to Northbound SR 241 (traffic to and from Southbound SR 241 instead, pay at the Tomato Springs Toll Plaza located on SR 241 immediately south of the SR 241 interchange). , the standard two-axle car toll for both the northbound offramp and southbound onramp of Irvine Boulevard is a flat rate of $2.12. The Orange Grove Toll Plaza instead uses a congestion pricing scheme based on the time of day for FasTrak users, while non-FasTrak drivers must pay the $3.50 maximum toll regardless of the day and time.

Major intersections

See also

References

External links

 – includes toll information on SR 133 and the other Toll Roads of Orange County
California @ AARoads - California 133
California Highway Conditions: SR 133
California Highways: SR 133

133
State Route 133
San Joaquin Hills
133
133
Irvine, California
Laguna Beach, California